Shahrudi may be,

Shahrudi language
Mahmud Hashemi-Shahrudi